Malik Sealy (February 1, 1970 – May 20, 2000) was an American professional basketball player, active from 1992 until his death in an automobile accident at the age of 30. Sealy played eight seasons in the National Basketball Association (NBA) for the Indiana Pacers, Los Angeles Clippers, Detroit Pistons and Minnesota Timberwolves.

Early life
A native of the Bronx, New York, Sealy was named after noted African-American social activist Malik Shabazz, better known as Malcolm X, for whom Sealy's father had been a bodyguard. In his senior year at Tolentine High School, Sealy, along with future collegians Brian Reese, and Adrian Autry, went 30–1 and won the state title.

College career 
Sealy played college basketball at St. John's University, finishing his college career with 2,401 points, good for second all-time in St. John's history.

Professional career

NBA (1992–2000) 
Sealy was drafted by the Indiana Pacers with the 14th overall pick in the 1992 NBA draft.

Over the course of his NBA career, Sealy averaged 10.1 points per game in 23.8 minutes. As a rookie, he lost his playbook, which was turned over to WFAN radio personality Don Imus, whom Sealy contacted on the air in an attempt to have it returned. His final season's highlights included making a game-winning reverse putback shot at the buzzer against the Orlando Magic on December 27, 1999, which gave the Timberwolves a 107–105 road win. He also made a game-winning 3-pointer off the glass as time expired in a 101–100 Timberwolves win over the Indiana Pacers on January 17, 2000.

Acting career
Sealy was also an aspiring actor, and had a major role as the talented but selfish basketball player 'Stacey Patton' in the 1996 motion picture Eddie starring Whoopi Goldberg. He also made appearances on TV shows such as The Sentinel and Diagnosis: Murder. In addition to this, Sealy designed ties and clothing and owned "Malik Sealy XXI, Inc."

Death
Sealy was killed in St. Louis Park, Minnesota on May 20, 2000.  He was driving home from a birthday celebration for teammate and best friend Kevin Garnett in downtown Minneapolis when his sport utility vehicle was struck by a pickup truck traveling the wrong way down the highway. The truck was driven by 43-year-old Souksangouane Phengsene, who survived the accident with head and chest injuries. Neither driver was wearing a seatbelt. Phengsene's airbag deployed, but Sealy's SUV did not have one.

Blood tests indicated that at the time of the accident, Phengsene had been driving drunk; his blood alcohol content was 0.19%. The legal limit in Minnesota at the time was 0.1%. He pleaded guilty to a charge of vehicular manslaughter, was given a four-year prison term, and was released from prison in 2003.  In April, 2008, Phengsene was given an eight year sentence for a subsequent drunk driving conviction.

Sealy is buried at Ferncliff Cemetery in Hartsdale, New York.

Legacy
In Sealy's honor, the Minnesota Timberwolves retired his #2 jersey. Kevin Garnett also paid a tribute to him, having written "2MALIK" in the inside of the tongue on the Adidas Garnett 3 shoes. Garnett has a tattoo honoring Sealy's name on his right arm. Upon being traded from the Boston Celtics to the Brooklyn Nets in July 2013, Garnett changed his uniform number to #2 in honor of Sealy. In his homecoming to Minnesota on February 25, 2015, Kevin Garnett wore a #2 sweatband on his left forearm in memory of his best friend.

Career statistics

Regular season

|-
| style="text-align:left;"|
| style="text-align:left;"|Indiana
| 58 || 2 || 11.6 || .426 || .226 || .689 || 1.9 || .8 || .6 || .1 || 5.7
|-
| style="text-align:left;"|
| style="text-align:left;"|Indiana
| 43 || 5 || 14.5 || .405 || .250 || .678 || 2.7 || 1.1 || .7 || .2 || 6.6
|-
| style="text-align:left;"|
| style="text-align:left;"|L.A. Clippers
| 60 || 41 || 26.7 || .435 || .301 || .780 || 3.6 || 1.8 || 1.2 || .4 || 13.0
|-
| style="text-align:left;"|
| style="text-align:left;"|L.A. Clippers
| 62 || 48 || 25.8 || .415 || .210 || .799 || 3.9 || 1.9 || 1.4 || .5 || 11.5
|-
| style="text-align:left;"|
| style="text-align:left;"|L.A. Clippers
| 80 || 79 || 30.7 || .396 || .356 || .876 || 3.0 || 2.1 || 1.6 || .6 || 13.5
|-
| style="text-align:left;"|
| style="text-align:left;"|Detroit
| 77 || 10 || 21.3 || .428 || .220 || .824 || 2.8 || 1.3 || .8 || .3 || 7.7
|-
| style="text-align:left;"|
| style="text-align:left;"|Minnesota
| 31 || 7 || 23.6 || .411 || .261 || .902 || 3.0 || 1.2 || 1.0 || .2 || 8.1
|-
| style="text-align:left;"|
| style="text-align:left;"|Minnesota
| 82 || 61 || 29.2 || .476 || .286 || .812 || 4.3 || 2.4 || .9 || .2 || 11.3
|- class="sortbottom"
| style="text-align:center;" colspan="2"|Career
| 493 || 253 || 23.8 || .426 || .292 || .809 || 3.2 || 1.7 || 1.1 || .3 || 10.1

Playoffs

|-
| style="text-align:left;"|1993
| style="text-align:left;"|Indiana
| 3 || 0 || 6.0 || .000 || .000 || 1.000 || .7 || .0 || .0 || .0 || .7
|-
| style="text-align:left;"|1997
| style="text-align:left;"|L.A. Clippers
| 3 || 3 || 26.3 || .480 || .200 || .733 || 1.0 || 1.7 || .0 || .0 || 12.0
|-
| style="text-align:left;"|1999
| style="text-align:left;"|Minnesota
| 4 || 0 || 17.5 || .348 ||  || .800 || 1.5 || .8 || .3 || .3 || 5.0
|-
| style="text-align:left;"|2000
| style="text-align:left;"|Minnesota
| 4 || 4 || 30.5 || .463 || .333 || .688 || 4.5 || 1.3 || .5 || .0 || 12.5
|- class="sortbottom"
| style="text-align:center;" colspan="2"|Career
| 14 || 7 || 20.6 || .415 || .222 || .737 || 2.1 || .9 || .2 || .1 || 7.7

See also
List of basketball players who died during their careers

Notes

External links
  Malik Sealy Statistics – Basketball-Reference.com
 
 

1970 births
2000 deaths
2000 road incidents
African-American basketball players
All-American college men's basketball players
American men's basketball players
Basketball players from New York City
Burials at Ferncliff Cemetery
Detroit Pistons players
Indiana Pacers players
Indiana Pacers draft picks
Los Angeles Clippers players
McDonald's High School All-Americans
Minnesota Timberwolves players
National Basketball Association players with retired numbers
Parade High School All-Americans (boys' basketball)
Road incident deaths in Minnesota
Shooting guards
Small forwards
Sportspeople from the Bronx
St. John's Red Storm men's basketball players
20th-century African-American sportspeople
American manslaughter victims